Chileans in Finland are people from Chile residing in Finland.

History
Following the 1973 Chilean coup d'état, around 300 Chilean refugees fled to Finland. They were the first refugee group to be taken by the government. On 18 November 1973, it was reported that the first refugees were leaving Santiago and headed to Helsinki. This was handled by Finnish Red Cross. The head manager Gunnar Rosén made sure that the refugees were taken care of until everyone had a job and an apartment. They were also promised necessary education. The first group arrived the next day on 19 November 1973. There were about 30 refugees, among them other Latin Americans.

The Finns welcomed Chileans. Many people in Finland felt sympathy towards them. For example, in 1974, there was a protest in Helsinki Senate Square against the Chilean coup d'état, where nearly 10,000 protested.

Employment
39.1% of Chileans are employed, 13.8% are unemployed and 47.1% are outside the labour force. Most Chileans are employed as teachers, health care workers, natural science and engineering specialists and housekeepers.

Organizations
 Suomi-Chile-Seura r.y

Notable people

 Diandra, singer
 Marce Rendic, radio personality

See also
 Chile–Finland relations

References

 
Ethnic groups in Finland
Chile–Finland relations
Finland